Anson County Schools is a PK–12 graded school district serving Anson County, North Carolina. Its 11 schools serve 3,845 students as of the 2010–2011 school year.

History
Attempts at common schools began in Anson County as early as the mid-1700s. The Revolutionary War and its aftermath halted progress in this area for a while. Later, many academies and subscription schools abounded in the area. One of the first in the area was Wadesborough Academy which was authorized by the state legislature in 1791. Fundraising was often done by state-authorized lotteries. 

Although no records exist that show when the first public schools were officially formed in the county, by 1899 there existed 50 schools for white students and 37 for black students. At that time, the school year was only about three to four months long. They still had 87 schools by 1912 with over 100 teachers. The school year was expanded to six months in the 1920s.

School consolidation began after World War I, culminating in the merger of Wadesboro City Schools into Anson County Schools in 1960, shortly after the consolidation of Anson High School. Bowman High School, named for former long-time superintendent J. O. Bowman opened as an integrated school in 1967, after originally being built to be a segregated school.

Through the 1930s to the 1950s, Anson County Schools was governed by a five-member Board of Education and was divided into six school districts. Each of these districts had a committee authorized to hire their own principals and teachers, as well as set district calendars. During this time the split year schedule was developed because of the rural, farm family demographics of the school students. The school year would start in early July and last for several weeks taking a break in mid August until after harvests were finished. The regular, longer school year would then start in late October.

Student demographics
For the 2010–2011 school year, Anson County Schools had a total population of 3,845 students and 248.47 teachers on a (FTE) basis. This produced a student-teacher ratio of 15.47:1. That same year, out of the total student population, the gender ratio was 50% male to 50% female. The demographic group makeup was: Black, 59%; White, 32%; Hispanic, 3%; Asian/Pacific Islander, 2%; and American Indian, 1% (two or more races: 3%). For the same school year, 76.59% of the students received free and reduced-cost lunches.

Governance
The primary governing body of Anson County Schools follows a council–manager government format with a nine-member Board of Education appointing a Superintendent to run the day-to-day operations of the system. The school system currently resides in the North Carolina State Board of Education's Sixth District.

Board of Education
The Anson County Schools Board of Education elects seven members by district to four-year staggered terms. Two others are elected as at-large members. The board generally meets on the last Monday of each month. The current board is:

 District members
 Daniel Wilson (District 1)
 Bobbie Little (District 2) (Vice-Chair)
 Beulah Pratt (District 3)
 Lisa G. Davis (District 4) (Chair)
 Russell Sikes (District 5)
 Michael Livingston (District 6)
 Carol Ann Gibson (District 7)
 At-Large members
 Marilynn Bennett
 George Truman

Superintendent
The current superintendent of Anson County Schools is Howard McLean . He has been superintendent since May 2020..

Member schools
Anson County Schools has eleven schools ranging from pre-kindergarten to twelfth grade. Those eleven schools are separated into four high schools, one middle school, and six elementary schools.

High schools
 Anson Academy (Wadesboro)
 Anson County Early College (Polkton)
 Anson High School (Wadesboro)
 Anson New Technology High School (Wadesboro)
  Anson County Career Connect Program (STEM) (Wadesboro)

Middle school
 Anson Middle School (Wadesboro)
 A new 165,000 square foot two-story middle school is set to be built adjacent to Anson High School. The official date for construction to begin is currently unknown. The estimated cost for the new school is said to be $52,688,803 with 
construction cost to be around $45,497,485.

Elementary schools
 Ansonville Elementary School (Ansonville)
 Lilesville Elementary School (Lilesville)
 Morven Elementary School (Morven)
 Peachland-Polkton Elementary School (Peachland)
 Wadesboro Elementary School (Wadesboro)
 Wadesboro Primary School (Wadesboro)

See also
List of school districts in North Carolina

References

External links
 

Education in Anson County, North Carolina
School districts in North Carolina